Hi-Teknology³ is the third installment of Hi-Tek's Hi-Teknology series. Tek, who made a name in the 90's via his collaborations with Talib Kweli and Mos Def, has always used his albums as a springboard for budding talents but Hi-Teknology³ takes the tradition to a new level. The album is geared towards shining light on today’s most promising newbies with help from some yet-to-be-named veterans. via Babygrande Records. It also been released in the U.K.

Track list
"Tek Intro"
"Life To Me" (featuring Estelle)
"Interlude" (featuring Lil' Skeeter)
"My Piano" (featuring Raekwon, Dion & Ghostface Killah)
"God's Plan" (featuring Young Buck & Outlawz)
"Ohio All Stars" (featuring Cross, Showtime, Mann, Chip tha Ripper)
"Back On The Grind" (featuring Riz, Kurupt & Dion)
"I'm Back" (featuring Rem Dog)
"Kill You" (featuring Push Montana)
"Handling My Bizness" (featuring Lep, Count (from Low End Professional), Big D & M-1)
"Come Get It (Tekrumentals)"
"Step Ya Game Up (Remix)" (featuring Little Brother & Dion)
"Know Me" (featuring Jonell)
"Time" (featuring Talib Kweli & Dion)
"Outro"

References

2007 albums
Hi-Tek albums
Babygrande Records albums
Albums produced by Hi-Tek
Sequel albums